The 2013–14 Ural season was the club's 1st season at the Russian Premier League, the highest tier of association football in Russia, since their relegation from the league in 1996. Ural finished the season in 11th place, whilst they were knocked out of the Russian Cup in the fifth round by Tosno.

Ural started the season under the management of Pavel Gusev, but he resigned on 1 August 2013, and replaced by Oleg Vasilenko. Vasilenko's contract was terminated by mutual consent on 27 November 2013, with Alexander Tarkhanov being appointed as the club's manager.

Squad

Transfers

Summer

In:

Out:

Winter

In:

Out:

Competitions

Russian Premier League

Results by round

Matches

League table

Russian Cup

Squad statistics

Appearances and goals

|-
|colspan="14"|Players away from the club on loan:

|-
|colspan="14"|Players who appeared for Ural no longer at the club:

|}

Top scorers

Disciplinary record

References

FC Ural Yekaterinburg seasons
Ural